Hemidactylus awashensis is a species of house gecko from Ethiopia.

References

Further reading
 

Hemidactylus
Reptiles described in 2015
Reptiles of Ethiopia
Endemic fauna of Ethiopia